Boeung Ket Football Club is a Cambodian professional football club based in Phnom Penh. It currently plays in the Cambodian Premier League, the top tier of football in the country. Founded in 2008 as Boeung Ket Rubber Field, it became Boeung Ket Angkor in 2015 and simply Boeung Ket FC in 2017. Originally based in Kampong Cham province, the club moved to play in Kandal province in 2018 and finally to the country's capital of Phnom Penh in 2019 with its current stadium, Cambodia Airways Stadium.

Boeung Ket has won the Cambodian League champions title in 2012, 2016, 2017 and 2020, and was runners-up in 2013, 2014 and 2018. In 2019, They won their first Hun Sen Cup trophy after beating the 2019 league champion, Svay Rieng in a penalty shootout.

Players

Record

Continental

Invitational

Domestic
Cambodian League
Champions: 2012, 2016, 2017, 2020
Runners-up: 2013, 2014, 2018
Hun Sen Cup
Champions: 2019
CNCC Charity Cup:
Champions: 2017

Club staff

Managers
Coaches by years

Captains
Captain by years (2015–)

Affiliated clubs
  Shonan Bellmare (2022–)

References

External links
 

Football clubs in Cambodia